P. darwinii may refer to:
 Pachycondyla darwinii, Forel, 1893, an ant species in the genus Pachycondyla found in India
 Pacifigorgia darwinii
 Parahelops darwinii
 Pleurodema darwinii, the four-eyed frog, a frog species found in Brazil, Chile, Uruguay and possibly Argentina
 Pleuropetalum darwinii, a plant species endemic to Ecuador
 Pterocnemia darwinii, the Darwin's Rhea, a large flightless bird species found in the Altiplano and Patagonia in South America

See also
 P. darwini (disambiguation)
 Darwinii (disambiguation)